Walter Russell Lambuth (November 10, 1854 – September 26, 1921) was a Chinese-born American Christian bishop who worked as a missionary establishing schools and hospitals in China, Korea and Japan in the 1880s.

Birth and family
Born in Shanghai, China as the eldest son of James William Lambuth and Mary Isabella McClellan, he was sent to his relatives in Tennessee and Mississippi for his early education.  Walter's parents were pioneering missionaries in China.  Together they also founded the mission work of the Methodist Episcopal Church, South in Japan.  Walter's grandfather had been a Preacher in the Mississippi Annual Conference.  Walter's great-grandfather, the Rev. William Lambuth, was a Preacher in the Holston Annual Conference (admitted in 1795).

Education
Walter graduated from Emory and Henry College in 1875, and later received theology and medical degrees from Vanderbilt University.

Ordination and Ministry
Bishop W. M. Wrightman appointed Walter R. Lambuth as the first pastor of Woodbine United Methodist Church in Nashville, Tennessee in 1875.   This was Rev. Lambuth’s first and only pastorate. Lambuth was ordained an elder in the Tennessee Conference of the Methodist Episcopal Church, South, and returned to China with his wife Daisy Kelly as a medical missionary in 1877. In 1883 with support from the Methodist Church Dr. Lambuth, alongside William Hector Park, founded Soochow Hospital. He was then dispatched to western Japan where they were founders of Methodist work in Japan. In 1889, he founded what has become one of the most prestigious universities in the Kansai region, Kwansei Gakuin University in Kobe.

Lambuth returned to the United States and took charge of all Methodist missionary work as General Secretary of the Board of Missions of the American Southern Methodist Episcopal Mission. In 1910, he was elected Bishop by the Methodist Episcopal Church, South and was assigned to Brazil. The following year, he established Methodist work in the Belgian Congo, Africa, alongside John Wesley Gilbert, a fellow Methodist missionary and the first professional African American archaeologist. Lambuth later traveled to Europe and established Southern Methodism in Belgium, Poland, Czechoslovakia, and Siberia. He supervised missionary work worldwide until his death in 1921. He died in Yokohama, Japan and his ashes were buried in Shanghai, China, next to his mother Mary.

Lambuth Day is held October 6 at Pearl River Church in Madison County, Mississippi.

The former Lambuth University in Jackson, Tennessee and the Lambuth Inn at Lake Junaluska, North Carolina were named in his honor. Lambuth Memorial United Methodist Church in Oklahoma City, Oklahoma was also named for him. Somesay the name was chosen the day he died in 1921 when the church began.

References

Leete, Frederick DeLand, Methodist Bishops.  Nashville, The Methodist Publishing House, 1948.

See also
 List of bishops of the United Methodist Church
 Christianity in Japan
 Christianity in Korea

Bishops of the Methodist Episcopal Church, South
American Methodist Episcopal, South bishops
1854 births
1921 deaths
Emory and Henry College alumni
Vanderbilt University alumni
American Methodist missionaries
Methodist missionaries in the Democratic Republic of the Congo
Methodist missionaries in Brazil
Protestant missionaries in Belgium
Protestant missionaries in Czechoslovakia
Methodist missionaries in Russia
Protestant missionaries in Poland
Methodist missionaries in China
Methodist missionaries in Japan
Burials in Shanghai
American expatriates in Brazil
Christian medical missionaries
American expatriates in the Belgian Congo
American expatriates in Belgium
American expatriates in Czechoslovakia
American expatriates in Russia
American expatriates in Japan
American expatriates in Poland
Methodist missionaries in Europe
University and college founders